The Rainbow Trail is a lost 1918 American silent Western film directed by Frank Lloyd.

The picture was an adaptation of Zane Grey's novel of the same name. It was a sequel to the 1918 film Riders of the Purple Sage, which also starred William Farnum as Lassiter. The Rainbow Trail was remade in 1925 and, with sound, in 1932.

Cast
 William Farnum as Lassiter
 Ann Forrest as Fay Larkin
 Mary Mersch as Jane Withersteen
 William Burress as Waggoner
 William Nigh as Shad (credited as William Nye)
 Genevieve Blinn as Ruth
 George Ross as U.S. Marshall
 Buck Jones as Cowboy (credited as Buck Gebhart)

See also
 1937 Fox vault fire

References

External links

 
 

1918 films
1918 Western (genre) films
1918 lost films
Films directed by Frank Lloyd
Fox Film films
Lost Western (genre) films
Lost American films
American black-and-white films
Films based on works by Zane Grey
Silent American Western (genre) films
1910s American films
1910s English-language films